Thirsty Suitors is an upcoming adventure video game developed by Outerloop Games and published by Annapurna Interactive.


Development
The studio began their development process by selecting three ideas for games to present to others in the video games industry in a pitch deck; the idea which later became Thirsty Suitors received the most positive attention. Co-founder and creative director of Outerloop, Chandana Ekanayake, noted that most of the individuals to whom Outerloop pitched the game were middle-aged white men, which caused Ekanayake to change his pitching strategy. This change involved focusing on the dearth of South Asian narratives in games, and highlighting successful media with such stories, such as the film Bend it Like Beckham and the television show Never Have I Ever.

After deciding to move forward with the idea behind Thirsty Suitors exclusively, Outerloop eventually secured financing from Annapurna. Outerloop increased its headcount to fourteen to develop the game. The game was announced in December 2021. As of June 2022, the game has no release date. On July 28 2022, the game was announced to be scheduled for release on Microsoft Windows, Nintendo Switch, PlayStation 4, PlayStation 5, Xbox One, and Xbox Series X/S, with a demo releasing on Steam the same day.

Premise
A woman, Jala, returns to her childhood home in Washington and must confront her former significant others.

References

External links 

 Official website

Upcoming video games
Adventure games
Annapurna Interactive games
Video games featuring female protagonists
Video games set in Washington (state)